The Episcopal Diocese of Georgia, USA is one of 20 dioceses that comprise Province IV of the US Episcopal Church, and is a diocese within the worldwide Anglican Communion. The current bishop is Frank S. Logue, who succeeded Scott Anson Benhase on May 30, 2020 when he was consecrated 11th Bishop of Georgia at a service held in Christ Church in Savannah, Georgia.

As of November 2019 there were 65 parishes, one aided parish, and four newer worshipping communities in the diocese, with 76 priests and 28 deacons.

History
The Episcopal Church in Georgia began as a small diocese of three parishes in 1823: Christ Church, Savannah; Christ Church, St. Simons Island; and St. Pauls, Augusta. Seventeen years later there were six churches as Christ Church, Macon; Trinity Church, Columbus; and Grace Church, Clarkesville had been added to the earlier three churches. Christ Church, Savannah's pledge of $400 to the ministry in Clarkesville made the ministry of Grace Church possible and secured the six parishes necessary to elect a bishop. The six parishes met in Clarkesville in 1840 to unanimously nominate and unanimously elect the then 36-year-old Stephen Elliott as the first Bishop of Georgia.

In 1861, Elliott and Leonidas Polk, Bishop of Louisiana issued a letter calling for a break with the General Convention of The Episcopal Church, which they noted came not from doctrinal differences but "political changes." The group that met in response to this letter formed the Protestant Episcopal Church of the Confederate States of America, with Elliott as its first and only Presiding Bishop. The Confederate church was reunited with the remainder of The Protestant Episcopal Church in the United States in 1865. Stephen Elliot died unexpectedly on December 21, 1866.

The following year, John W. Beckwith, then rector of Trinity Church, New Orleans. was elected as the second Bishop of the Diocese of Georgia. He was consecrated as Bishop on April 2, 1868 in St. John's Church, Savannah. Beckwith served as Bishop of the Episcopal Diocese of Georgia for 23 years during the difficult period of reconstruction. There were 31 churches in the diocese at the time of his consecration. At his death, there were 53 churches and five missions. In 1887-1888, Beckwith spent five months abroad preaching in Anglican Churches in Italy, France, England, Egypt and Palestine. He died November 23, 1890.

Finding a successor for Beckwith proved difficult as the diocese was twice turned down by those elected to the office. First Thomas Gailor who served as the Vice-Chancellor of the University of the South turned down the job after his election in May 1891. Then Ethelbert Talbot, Missionary Bishop of Wyoming and Idaho declined in July of that year. Both men cited their commitments to their present positions. Finally, on November 11, 1891 Cleland Kinchloch Nelson, rector of Church of the Nativity in South Bethlehem, Pennsylvania, was elected. He accepted the position and was consecrated as the third Bishop of Georgia on February 24, 1892 at St. Luke's Church, Atlanta.

As Bishop, Nelson challenged the Diocese of Georgia to grow and from 1893–1906, the diocese went from 88 missions to 108 missions with the 6,292 communicants of 1893 swelling to 9,229 by 1906. During that same time period, sixty-two church buildings were built. The Diocese of Atlanta (northwestern Georgia) was set apart from the Diocese of Georgia in 1907 with Nelson serving as its first Bishop. At the time of the separation, the reduced Diocese of Georgia had 4,439 communicants.

In 1907 Anna Alexander of the Diocese of Georgia became the first (and only ever) African-American deaconess in the Episcopal Church.

In February 1908 the Diocese of Georgia met in convention in Augusta and elected Frederick Focke Reese, rector of Christ Church, Nashville, Tennessee. as the fourth Bishop of Georgia. That spring, poor health caused the newly elected bishop to take an extended leave of absence, resuming ecclesiastical duties April 1, 1909. During his tenure as Bishop, the missionary work of the diocese concerned the creation of new missions for blacks. By 1913, there were two predominantly black parishes in the diocese, St. Athanasius Church, Brunswick and St. Stephen's, Savannah, as well as  thirteen predominantly black missions. Reese served until his retirement in 1934.

The election of a successor to Reese took two conventions to be decided. On August 30, 1934, a special convention was held at Grace Church, Waycross and failed in twelve ballots to elect a new bishop. A second session met January 15, 1935 at St. Paul's, Augusta and took nine more ballots to elect Middleton S. Barnwell, then Missionary Bishop of Idaho, to become the fifth Bishop of the Diocese of Georgia. At the time of his election, there were 16 parishes, 21 organized missions, 13 unorganized missions, five mission stations and one parochial mission. The still segregated church records noted 5,391 white and 1,029 black communicants. During his tenure as bishop, which lasted until 1954 the diocese grew to 8,156 total communicants with two more churches becoming parishes and four additional missions created.

During the diocesan convention of 1954 seventeen persons were nominated to succeed Barnwell. Even with the large field of candidates, Albert Rhett Stuart, Dean of Christ Church Cathedral, New Orleans, was elected on the second ballot and was consecrated as the sixth Bishop of the Diocese of Georgia in St. Paul's Church, Augusta, on October 20, 1954. In 1957, a newly acquired Diocesan House on East Bay Street in Savannah was dedicated as the diocesan headquarters. At that time, there were 9,976 communicants in the Episcopal Diocese of Georgia.

Paul Reeves was consecrated as the seventh Bishop of the Diocese of Georgia on September 30, 1969. He was succeeded by Harry W. Shipps who was consecrated on January 6, 1984. During Shipps' tenure as diocesan bishop, the diocese made headlines in 1990 when a former Assemblies of God minister, Stan White, lead his independent congregation to join the Episcopal Church en masse and as Christ the King Church, Valdosta, became a congregation in the Episcopal Diocese of Georgia.

The ninth Bishop of the Diocese of Georgia, Henry I. Louttit Jr., was rector of Christ Church, Valdosta at the time of his election. He was consecrated as bishop on January 21, 1995. Louttit had long been interested in liturgical renewal and was involved in the creation of the Book of Common Prayer 1979. Under Louttit's leadership, the Episcopal Diocese of Georgia has taken renewed interest in starting new congregations. He authorized the formation of the missions of St. Stephen's, Leesburg; Church of the Holy Comforter, Martinez; King of Peace, Kingsland; St. Luke's, Rincon, and the Episcopal Church of Our Savior at Honey Creek. Louttit's father, Henry I. Louttit Sr., was the last bishop of the Diocese of South Florida before it was divided into three new dioceses.

The tenth Bishop of Georgia was elected September 12, 2009 in Dublin, Georgia and consecrated on January 23, 2010 at the Savannah International Trade and Convention Center. Scott Benhase was graduated from Virginia Theological Seminary. He served at parishes in Indiana, North Carolina, Ohio and Virginia before he was called to be rector of St. Alban's, Washington, D.C. (Diocese of Washington) in 2006, where he was serving at the time of his election. Benhase's major initiative is the Campaign for Congregational Development, a capital campaign raising funds to enhance capacity in congregational growth and development, clergy and lay leader development, and leadership formation of youth and young adults.

The eleventh Bishop of Georgia, Frank S. Logue, was elected November 16, 2019 and consecrated on May 30, 2020 at Christ Church, Savannah.

Today the Diocese of Georgia now covers the southeastern  of the State of Georgia, running from the Chattahoochee River west of Americus to the Savannah River north of Augusta. Savannah is the see city. In February 2007, the Diocese of Georgia reported 18,651 communicants with an average Sunday attendance of 7,127 in its 71 churches.

Theologically, the Georgia Diocese runs the spectrum from moderate liberalism to traditionalist conservatism. Generally, congregations are typically more conservative than their neighbors in the Atlanta diocese, but in most places, especially in small towns, they are often the most liberal religious alternatives available in their communities, which are usually dominated by Southern-style fundamentalist traditions like the Southern Baptist Convention and the Presbyterian Church in America. The first significant episode of Anglican realignment activity in the diocese occurred when the rector and most of the congregation of Christ Church in Savannah left the Episcopal Church in 2007 to form Christ Church Anglican. More recently, in August 2012, the parish of St. John's Episcopal Church, in Moultrie, led by rector William McQueen, decided to leave the Episcopal Church to become St. Mark's Anglican Church of the Anglican Church in North America.

However, the diocese reorganized Christ Church with a basically new congregation in the early 2010s, and the town of Moultrie had another Episcopal parish for residents of Colquitt County to attend, minimizing the trauma of those two defections.

Bishops
The following is a list of the Bishops of the Diocese of Georgia:
1. Stephen Elliott 1841-1866 (deceased) was also presiding bishop of the Episcopal Church in the Confederate States of America.
2. John W. Beckwith 1868-1890 (deceased)
3. Cleland K. Nelson 1892-1907 (deceased)
4. Frederick F. Reese 1908-1936 (deceased)
5. Middleton S. Barnwell 1936-1954. (deceased)
6. Albert R. Stuart 1954-1971 (deceased)
7. Paul Reeves 1972-1985 (deceased)
8. Harry W. Shipps 1985-1994 (deceased)
9.  Henry I. Louttit Jr. 1995-2010 (deceased) 
10. Scott A. Benhase 2010-2020
11. Frank S. Logue 2020–present

List of parishes
Parishes:

Albany Convocation
 Calvary, Americus
 Christ Church, Cordele 
 Holy Spirit, Dawson,
 Holy Trinity, Blakely
 St. Anne's, Tifton 
 St. Francis, Camilla
 St. John and St. Mark's, Albany
 St. Matthew's, Fitzgerald 
 St. Patrick's, Albany 
 St. Paul's, Albany 
 Trinity, Cochran

Augusta Convocation
 Church of the Atonement, Augusta 
 Christ Church, Augusta
 Good Shepherd, Augusta 
 Holy Comforter, Martinez 
 Holy Cross, Thomson 
 Our Savior, Martinez 
 St. Alban's, Augusta 
 St. Augustine's, Augusta 
 St. Mary's, Augusta
 St. Michael's, Waynesboro 
 St. Paul's, Augusta 
 Trinity, Harlem

Central Convocation
 Annunciation, Vidalia 
 Christ Church, Dublin 
 Grace Church, Sandersville
 Good Shepherd, Swainsboro
 St. Luke's, Hawkinsville
 St. Mary Magdalen, Louisville 
 St. Thomas Aquinas, Baxley-Hazelhurst
 Trinity, Cochran
 Trinity, Statesboro

Savannah Convocation
All Saints, Tybee Island 
Christ Church, Savannah 
 St. Patrick's, Pooler 
 St. Bartholomew's Chapel, Burroughs
 St. Elizabeth of Hungary, Richmond Hill 
 St. Francis of the Islands, Wilmington Island 
 St. George's Chapel, Diocesan House, Savannah 
 St. George's, Savannah 
 St. John's, Savannah 
 St. Luke's, Rincon 
 St. Matthew's, Savannah 
 St. Michael and All Angels, Savannah
 St. Peter's, Skidaway Island 
 St. Paul the Apostle, Savannah 
 St. Philip's, Hinesville 
 St. Thomas, Isle of Hope

Southeastern Convocation
 Christ Church, St. Mary's 
Christ Church, St. Simons Island 
 Good Shepherd, Pennick
 Grace Church, Waycross 
 Holy Nativity, Saint Simons Island 
 King of Peace, Kingsland 
 Our Savior at Honey Creek, Waverly 
 St. Andrew's, Darien 
 St. Andrew's, Douglas 
 St. Cyprian's, Darien 
 St. Athanasius, Brunswick
 St. Mark's, Woodbine
 St. Mark's, Brunswick 
 St. Paul's, Jesup 
 St. Richard of Chichester, Jekyll Island

Southwestern Convocation
 All Saints, Thomasville 
 Christ Church, Valdosta 
 Christ the King, Valdosta 
 Good Shepherd, Thomasville
 St. Barnabas, Valdosta 
 St. James, Quitman 
 St. John's, Bainbridge 
 St. Margaret of Scotland, Moultrie 
 St. Thomas, Thomasville

See also

 List of Succession of Bishops for the Episcopal Church, USA

References

External links
The Episcopal Diocese of Georgia
The Episcopal Church
Honey Creek, the Camp and Conference Center of the Episcopal Diocese of Georgia
Journal of the Annual Convention, Diocese of Georgia

1823 establishments in Georgia (U.S. state)
Anglican dioceses established in the 19th century
Georgia
Diocese of Georgia
Province 4 of the Episcopal Church (United States)
Religious organizations established in 1823